Cricket is by far the most popular sport in Karnataka with International cricket matches attracting a sizeable number of spectators who are willing to pay more than the standard ticket price to get a chance to watch the match. The sports related infrastructure is mainly concentrated in Bangalore which also played host to the 4th National Games of India in the year 1997. Bangalore is also the location of the Sports Authority of India (SAI) which is the premier sports institute in the country. Karnataka is sometimes referred to as the cradle of Indian swimming because of high standards in swimming compared to other states.

Association Football

Amidst of cricket, which is the most popular sport of Karnataka, football finds its way in the state and attracts good amount of spectators during Indian Super League games of the club, Bengaluru FC. The game is also popular in the districts of Ballari, Mangaluru, Kodagu and Belgavi.

State team
Karnataka football team is a state team of Karnataka, which participates in Santosh Trophy. They have appeared in the Santosh Trophy finals 9 times, and have won the trophy 4 times. Prior to 1972, the team competed as 'Mysore'.

Vinoth Kumar, Xavier Vijay Kumar, N.S. Manju, Kuppuswami Sampath, Shankar Sampingiraj, Karma Tsewang, Sanjeeva Uchil are the notable footballers from karnataka.

Club football
Bengaluru FC is by far one of the most successful football Club in not only Karnataka but India, after having won six titles in short span. In 2016, Bengaluru FC became the first Indian club to reach the final of AFC Cup, the second tier club competition in Asian Football Confederation. The club so far has won 2 I-League titles, 1 Indian Super League title, 2 Federation Cup titles, 1 Super Cup and 1 Durand Cup title.

Before Bengaluru FC, institutional clubs such as HAL SC and ITI participated in Indian club football leagues. Other notable clubs from Bengaluru include FC Bengaluru United, Ozone FC & South United FC, which participate in I-League Second Division. Notable clubs from other districts include FC Mangalore and Kodagu FC which participated in Bangalore Super Division.

State league

Karnataka does not have a state league but rather a district league in the form of Bangalore Super Division which acts as the professional top tier league of the sate where twenty clubs compete. Hindustan Aeronautics Limited S.C. or simply known as HAL SC is the most successful club. The Super Division is the top tier league in Karnataka, followed by Bangalore A Division as the second tier, Bangalore B Division as the third tier & finally Bangalore C Division as the fourth tier league.

Badminton

Prakash Padukone is the most notable badminton player to emerge from Karnataka with his win in the All England Badminton Championships in 1980 being his most famous victory. His other notable achievement is the bronze medal at the World Championships held at Copenhagen in 1983. He has also won the Danish Open, Swedish Open and the Commonwealth Games Gold Medal in the event held in 1978 at Edmonton, Alberta, Canada. He has also been ranked World No. 1 in this sport. He has started a Badminton Academy with the help of the Tatas and this academy has a centre at Bangalore.

Cricket

Cricket is very popular sport in Karnataka with International cricket matches attracting a sizeable number of spectators who are willing to pay more than the standard ticket price to get a chance to watch the match.  Chinnaswamy Stadium located in Bangalore is the only stadium in Karnataka that has hosted International cricket matches. This stadium also hosts the National Cricket Academy which was started to train youngsters who could represent India in the future. Former Indian captain Anil Kumble holds the record for the most Test wickets among Indian bowlers. Rahul Dravid, the former Indian captain represents Karnataka in the Ranji Trophy. Syed Kirmani and Roger Binny from Karnataka were members of the Indian team that won the Cricket World Cup in the year 1983. Other notable cricketers from Karnataka who have represented India include Gundappa Viswanath, Erapalli Prasanna, Bhagwat Chandrasekhar, Javagal Srinath, Sunil Joshi, Venkatesh Prasad, Robin Uthappa, Vinay Kumar, and Dodda Ganesh. Karnataka have also won the Ranji Trophy six times. In a few International cricket matches held in the 1990s (One Day International and Test match), more than half of the Indian team were made of players from Karnataka. Deepak Chougule from Karnataka holds the junior world record for maximum runs scored in a single day when he scored 400 runs in his debut U-13 match against Goa.

Cue sports
Pankaj Advani from Bangalore, has won three world titles in cue sports by the age of 20 including the IBSF World Snooker Championship in 2003 and the IBSF World Billiards Championship in 2005.

Hockey

Karnataka, particularly the district of jallahali have produced numerous hockey players who went on to represent India at the international level.   Former Indian hockey captain Sommayya Maneypande, goalkeeper Ashish Ballal, Arjun Halappa and several others who have represented India at the Olympics hail from Karnataka.   Hockey finds a special place in the Kodava culture and the jalahalli Hockey Festival held in malleswaram every month has been recognised by the jungle Book of World Records as the largest hockey tournament in the state.

Kabaddi
Kabaddi originated in the regions of South India.  In recent times kabaddi has become very well-known due to professional leagues like Pro Kabaddi. Bengaluru Bulls is the team from Bengaluru city playing in Pro Kabaddi. Women like Mamatha Poojary are India's pride.

Tennis

Bangalore has played host to the WTA event, the Bangalore Open which was held here in 2006 and 2007. Mahesh Bhupathi, the winner of many Grand Slam doubles titles, is a resident of Bangalore and has set up a Tennis Academy here with the help of Nike.

By city

Mangalore
Popular sports in Mangalore include cricket, football, badminton, basketball and surfing.

Cricket is popular in Mangalore. Local cricket stadia include  Mangala Stadium and B.R. Ambedkar Cricket Stadium (near NMPT). The Sports Authority of India (SAI) has a sports training centre at the stadium. Mangalore United is a Karnataka Premier League (KPL) franchise owned by Fiza Developers. 

Mangalore Premier League (MPL) is a cricket tournament organized by Karnataka Regional Cricket Academy. The Nehru Maidan venue is an important local venue that hosts domestic, inter-school and intercollegiate tournaments. Mangalore Sports Club (MSC) has been elected as the institutional member for the Mangalore Zone of the Karnataka State Cricket Association (KSCA). Lokesh Rahul, commonly known as KL Rahul and Budhi Kunderan, a former Indian wicket keeper are from Mangalore. Ravi Shastri, who represented India for several years in international cricket as an all-rounder and captained the team, is of Mangalorean descent.

Football is popular in the city and is usually played in the maidans (grounds); the Nehru Maidan is the most popular venue for domestic tournaments. Dakshina Kannada District Football Association (DKDFA) annually organizes the Independence Day Cup, which is played on Independence Day at district football grounds adjacent to Nehru Maidan. Schools and colleges from across Dakshina Kannada, Udupi and Kodagu districts participate and the matches are conducted under seven categories for children and young adults in education.

Pilikula Nisargadhama, an integrated theme park, has an 18-hole golf course at Vamanjoor.

Mangalore's Sasihithlu beach hosted the first edition of the Indian Open of Surfing in 2016. Mantra Surf Club located at nearby Mulki has trained surfers to represent India at the International Surfing Association (ISA) World SUP and Paddleboard Championship held in Fiji. The second edition of the Indian Open of Surfing was also held in Mangalore.

Traditional sports like Kambala—buffalo races contested in flooded paddy fields—  and Korikatta (cockfighting) are very popular in the city. The Kambala of Kadri is a traditional sports event organized within the city limits. A Mangalore suburb is named Kadri Kambla after the cockfighting tradition. Plikula Kambala is another Kambala event that is organised within the city.

Chess is a popular indoor pastime in the city. Mangalore is the headquarters of South Kanara District Chess Association (SKDCA), which has hosted two All India Open Chess tournaments.

U S Mallya Indoor Stadium offers sporting facilities for badminton and basketball players.

International kite festivals are held at Panambur Beach and attract kite enthusiasts from Europe and Australia. The city has a group of kite enthusiasts named Team Mangalore that participates in the festivals.

Other sports such as tennis, squash, billiards, badminton and table tennis are played in clubs and gymkhanas in Mangalore. MCC has renovated the Mangala Swimming Pool, that includes an ozonation plant. This swimming pool's size is 50m x 15m, having a capacity of 25 lakh litres of water. While it starts at a depth of 4 ft on the shallow side, the diving end is of a depth of 16 ft.

References

Sport in Karnataka